Pleasant Valley Secondary is a public high school in Armstrong, British Columbia part of School District 83 North Okanagan-Shuswap. They are well known throughout British Columbia for their strong track & field program taught by Mr. Cameron, as well as being one of the only schools in the interior to have a competitive dance team. The PVSS Adrenaline Dance Team had a five-year undefeated streak in the Open Division until April 2009 where they were defeated by only half a point. In 2011 the PVSS Adrenaline Dance Team received 1st in the Hip Hop Category in two different British Columbia Dance competitions.

The school doesn't have a specific mascot but the PVSS Torch is the schools symbol. PVSS sports teams consist of the Saints and Sinners. 

The school board has been working on changing the team name “Saints and Sinners” because it has many negative undertones.
As of May 2021, the PVSS sports teams has changed their name to the Hawks. Settling on a logo that displays a red hawk perched on the P of the PVSS. 

The Jr. Saint basketball team had an excellent 201718 season. They amassed a total of two wins.

The school currently includes grades 9 through 12.

References

High schools in British Columbia
Schools in the Okanagan
Educational institutions in Canada with year of establishment missing